Papistylus is a genus of flowering plants belonging to the family Rhamnaceae.

Its native range is Southwestern Australia.

Species:

Papistylus grandiflorus 
Papistylus intropubens

References

Rhamnaceae
Rhamnaceae genera